A.R.T. Studios was the private music studio of music producer Michael Cretu, located in his mansion in the hills of Ibiza, Spain. In May 2009 the mansion together with the studio were demolished. The studio itself was used by Cretu until 2005, when he moved to a mobile computerized system "Alchemist" and from 2010 a new system named "Merlin".

This studio was designed and built by Gunter Wagner and Bernd Steber (Sydney/Australia) and was used in the recording of all of Cretu's productions (Enigma, Sandra, Trance Atlantic Air Waves).

Control Room
Bernd Steber came up with the idea of hiding all acoustical trapping behind a full-size piece of canvas which could be stretched from one side of the room to the other and painted like a picture. The artist painted a night sky with thousands of stars and some very close star nebulas, similar as seen on images taken from the Hubble Space Telescope. 
The walls are built with blocks of open porous sandstone and they seem to break in an irregular line just under the ceiling. The big monitor speakers and the outboard equipment racks are built into these sandstone walls and the entrance into the room is through two big Arabic sandstone arcs in the back. 
The floor is covered with a wall-to-wall carpet which was printed with a reproduction of the moon's surface. 
There is a huge arc-shaped window in the front of the room with a view down the hill to the sea.

Technical Details
All external equipment is wired to a large digital mixing console which was custom built by AMEK and the German Company Mega Audio according to Michael Cretu's preferred working procedures. This console is physically small but it has 160 inputs to collect most signals coming from any midi source, computer or microphone without the need of any patch bay. 
This is possible because all active components are located outside in some huge racks in the machine room. This keeps all noise and unnecessary heat out of the control room and reduces physical size.

All recording is done on a Pro Tools system hardware and Emagic's latest version of Logic Audio Platinum software. Software samplers as Samplecell, Steinberg's Halion and the PC-based StudioSampler are all linked and sync-ed together on demand. There are several racks full of external MIDI modules and hardware samplers as well as a selection of reverb systems as the Lexicon 480 and 960 as well as some more exotic reverbs like the vintage Yamaha REV1, REV7 and REV9, the Eventide DRP9000 and the Dynacord DRP20. Integrated is Michael's old Waveframe 1000. This was the machine that made Enigma happening in the first place in 1990. It was the first real fully professional digital "Studio-in-a-box". Its constant sampling rate system is brilliant and the sample editing and archiving feature is still unmatched. The monitoring system was especially designed and built by Quested Acoustics.

From the credits of various albums, it is known that Michael Cretu uses or has used the Waveframe 1000, Audioframe Workstation, MiniMoog, PPG System, Korg M1, C-Lab Notator, Takamine 6 and 12-string acoustic guitars, Tom Anderson electric guitars, Otari DTR-900, Akai S900, Linn 9000, Sequential Circuits Prophet 2000, Oberheim Xpander, EMS Vocoder, Yamaha DX-7, Roland MKS-80 Super Jupiter, Roland V-Synth, Korg OASYS, Korg Karma.

References

External links
 A.R.T. Studio tour from EnigmaMusic.com
 Interview with Gunter Wagner, engineer and designer of A.R.T. Studios

Other Enigma studios
Michael Cretu worked in the A.R.T. Studios only on his first five Enigma albums. For the sixth and seventh album he used "Alchemist", an all in one computed mobile studio. And for the eighth album he will use "Merlin", the successor of "Alchemist".
 ALCHEMIST: Long description, pictures (in Spanish)
 ALCHEMIST: description, technical details, pictures
 MERLIN: description, technical details

Recording studios in Spain
Enigma (German band)